Salam International Investment Limited Q.P.S.C. is a publicly-listed Qatar shareholding company. Salam International operates through its subsidiaries in Qatar, the United Arab Emirates, Palestine, Kuwait, Saudi Arabia, Oman, Bahrain, Jordan and Lebanon. The company is headquartered in Doha, Qatar.

Investments

Construction & development
Alu Nasa
Atelier 21
Gulf Industries
International Trading & Contracting Company
Modern Decoration Company
Q Gardens
Salam Enterprises
Salam Industries
Qatar Boom Electrical Engineering 
Stream Industrial & Engineering

Energy
Salam Petroleum Services - SPS
Stream Industrial & Engineering - STREAM
Qatari German Switchgear Company WLL - QGC

Technology & communications
Salam Technology (Formerly known as "Omnix Qatar" & "Salam Technical Services")
Itelligent Technologies
Salam Media Cast 
Salam Sice Tech Solutions

Luxury & consumer products
Middle East Marketing
Salam Group

Investment & Real Estate
Salam Bounian
Ejada

References

External links
Salam International
Salam Enterprises
Salam International Investment (SIIS.DSM)
Salam International Investment (SALAM.DFM)

Financial services companies established in 1952
Investment companies of the United Arab Emirates
Investment companies of Qatar
1952 establishments in Qatar
Companies based in Doha
Companies listed on the Qatar Stock Exchange